Hanna Vitalyevna Prakatsen (born 6 September 1992) is a Belarus-born Russian rower. She competed in the 2020 Summer Olympics.

References

1992 births
Living people
Sportspeople from Minsk
Rowers from Saint Petersburg
Russian people of Belarusian descent
Rowers at the 2020 Summer Olympics
Russian female rowers
Belarusian female rowers
Belarusian emigrants to Russia
Olympic rowers of Russia
Olympic medalists in rowing
Olympic silver medalists for the Russian Olympic Committee athletes
Medalists at the 2020 Summer Olympics
European Rowing Championships medalists